The Olympic-Wallowa lineament (OWL) – first reported by cartographer Erwin Raisz in 1945 on a relief map of the continental United States – is a physiographic feature of unknown origin in the state of Washington (northwestern U.S.) running approximately from the town of Port Angeles, on the Olympic Peninsula to the Wallowa Mountains of eastern Oregon.

Location
Raisz located the OWL particularly from Cape Flattery (the northwest corner of the Olympic Peninsula) and along the north shore of Lake Crescent, thence the Little River (south of Port Angeles), Liberty Bay (Poulsbo), Elliott Bay (setting the orientation of the streets in downtown Seattle), the north shore of Mercer Island, the Cedar River (Chester Morse Reservoir), Stampede Pass (Cascade crest), the south side of the Kittitas Valley (I-90), Manastash Ridge, the Wallula Gap (on the Columbia River where it approaches the Oregon state line), and then the South Fork of the Walla Walla River into the northeastern corner of Oregon. After crossing the Blue Mountains Riasz associated the OWL with a dramatic scarp on the north side of the Wallowa Mountains. Riasz observed that the OWL tends to have basins on the north side (Seattle Basin, Kittitas Valley, Pasco Basin, Walla Walla Basin) and mountains on the southern side (the Olympics, Manastash and Umtanum ridges, Rattlesnake Mountain, the Horseheaven Hills, the Wallowa Mountains), and noted parallel alignments at various points, generally about four miles north or south of the main line. The alignment of these particular features is somewhat irregular; modern maps with much more detail show a broad zone of more regular alignments. Subsequent geological investigations have suggested various refinements and adjustments.

Introduction to a puzzle

Most geological features are initially identified or characterized from a local expression of that feature. The OWL was first identified as a perceptual effect, a pattern perceived by the human visual system in a broad field of many seemingly random elements. But is it real?  Or just an optical illusion, such as the Kanizsa triangle (see image), where we "see" a triangle that does not really exist?

Raisz considered whether the OWL might be just a chance alignment of random elements, and geologists since have not been able to find any common unitary feature, nor identify any connection between the various local elements.  called it a "fictional structural element". Yet it has been found to coincide with many faults and fault zones, and to delineate significant differences of geology. These are much too correlated to be dismissed as random alignments. But for all of its prominence, there is as yet no understanding of what the OWL is or how it came to be.

The OWL piques the interest of geologically minded persons in part because its characteristic NW-SE angle of orientation – approximately 50 to 60 degrees west of north (a little short of northwest) – is shared by many other seeming local features across a broad swath of geography. Around Seattle these include strikingly parallel alignments at the south end of Lake Washington, the north side of Elliott Bay, the valley of the Ship Canal, the bluff along Interlaken Blvd. (aligned with the Ship Canal, but offset slightly to the north), the alignment of Ravenna Creek (draining Green Lake southeast into Union Bay) and Carkeek Creek (northwest into Puget Sound), various stream drainages around Lake Forest Park (north end of Lake Washington), and (on the Eastside) the Northrup Valley (Hwy. 520 from Yarrow Bay to the Overlake area), and various smaller details too numerous to mention. All of these are carved into "recent" (less than 18,000 years old) glacial deposits, and it is difficult to conceive of how these could be controlled by anything other than a recent glacial process.

Yet the same orientation shows up in the Brothers, Eugene-Denio, and McLoughlin fault zones in Oregon (see map, below), which are geological features tens of millions of years old, and the Walker Lane lineament in Nevada.

Likewise to the east, where both the OWL and the Brothers Fault Zone become less distinct in Idaho where they hit the old North American continental craton and the track of Yellowstone hotspot. But some 50 miles to the north is the parallel Trans-Idaho Discontinuity, and further north, the Osburn fault (Lewis and Clark line) running roughly from Missoula to Spokane. And aeromagnetic and gravitational anomaly surveys suggest extension into the interior of the continent.

Structural relationships with other features

A problem in evaluating any hypothesis regarding the OWL is a dearth of evidence. Raisz suggested that the OWL might be a "transcurrent fault" (long strike-slip faults at what are now known to be plate boundaries), but lacked both data and competence to assess it. One of the first speculations that the OWL might be a major geological structure  – written when the theory of plate tectonics was still new and not entirely accepted – was called by the author "an outrageous hypothesis". Modern investigation is still largely balked by the immense span of geography involved and lack of continuous structures, the lack of clearly cross-cutting features, and a confusing expression in both rock millions of years old and glacial sediments only 16,000 years old.

Geological investigation of a feature begins with determining its structure, composition, age, and relationship with other features. The OWL does not cooperate. It is expressed as an orientation in many elements of diverse structure and compositions, and even as a boundary between areas of differing structure and composition; there is yet no understanding of what kind of feature or process – the "ur-OWL" – could control this. Nor are there particular "OWL" rocks which can be examined and radiometrically dated. We are left with determining its age by looking at its relationship with other features, such as which features overlap or cross-cut other (presumably older) features. In the following sections we will look at several features which might be expected to have some kind of structural relationship with the OWL, and consider what they might tell us about the OWL.

Cascade Range
The most notable geological feature crossing the OWL is the Cascade Range, raised up in the Pliocene (two to five million years ago) as a result of the Cascadia subduction zone. These mountains are distinctly different on either side of the OWL, the material of the South Cascades being Cenozoic (<66 Ma) volcanic and sedimentary rock, and the North Cascades being much older Paleozoic (hundreds of millions of years) metamorphic and plutonic rocks. It is unknown whether this difference is in any way linked with the OWL, or is simply a coincidental regional difference.

Raisz judged the Cascades on the north side of the OWL to be offset about six miles to the west, and similarly for the Blue Mountains, but this is questionable, and similar offsets are not apparent in the older – up to 17 Ma (millions of years) old – Columbia River basalt flows. In general, there are no clear indications of structures offset by the OWL, but neither are there any distinct features crossing the OWL (and older than 17 Ma) that positively demonstrate a lack of offsetting.

Straight Creek Fault

The Straight Creek Fault (SCF) – just east of Snoqualmie Pass and running nearly due north into Canada – is a major fault notable for considerable identified dextral strike-slip offset (opposite side moving laterally to the right) of at least . Its intersection with the OWL (near Kachess Lake) is the geological equivalent of an atom smasher, and the results should be informative. For example, that the OWL is not offset suggests that it must be younger than the last strike-slip motion on the SCF, anywhere from around 44 to about 41 million years ago (i.e., during the middle-Eocene epoch). And if the OWL is a strike-slip fault or megashear, as many have speculated, then it should offset the SCF, and whether the OWL offsets the SCF, or not, becomes an important test of just what the OWL is.

So does the OWL offset the SCF, or not?  It is hard to say, as no trace whatsoever has been found of the SCF anywhere south of the OWL. While some geologists have speculated that it does continue directly south, albeit hidden under younger deposits, not a trace has been found.

If the SCF fault does not continue directly southward – and the utter lack of evidence that it does makes a case for evidence of lack – then where else might it be?  suggest some possibilities: it may curve to the east, it may curve to the west, or it may just end.

Tabor mapped the SCF turning and merging with the Taneum fault (coincident with the OWL) south of Kachess Lake. This conforms with the general pattern seen in Lakes Keechelus, Kachess, and Cle Elum, and associated geological units and faults (see image, right): each is aligned north—south at the north end, but turns to the southeast where it approaches the OWL. This is suggestive of the OWL being a left lateral (sinistral) strike-slip fault that has distorted and offset the SCF. But that is inconsistent with the SCF itself and most other strike-slip faults associated with the OWL being right lateral (dextral), and incompatible with the geology to the southeast. Particularly, studies of the region to the southeast (in connection with Department of Energy activities at the Hanford Reservation) show no indication of any fault or other structure comparable to the SCF.

On the other hand,  maps the SCF as proceeding southerly (without addressing the situation south of the OWL). (He has subsequently speculated that the missing part of the SCF may have been dextrally offset to become a southerly trending fault in the Puget Lowland. But same problem: later deposits cover any traces.) The seeming southeasterly curvature is possibly explained as a geometrical effect of foreshortening: it occurs in a belt of intense folding (much resembling a rug which has slid against a wall) which, if unfolded, could restore some of the "curves" to a linear position along the southerly extension of the SCF.

There seem to be no indications that the SCF turns to the west. Although such indications would mostly be buried, the general sense of the topography suggests no such turn. Displacement, to either the west or the east, seems unlikely in that certain effects that would be expected are not found.

Could the SCF just end? This is difficult to comprehend. If there is displacement along this fault, where did it come from? To quote Wyld et al. (albeit in the context of a different fault): "it cannot just end". Although the SCF has had substantial strike-slip displacement,  claim that final major movement on the SCF (about 40 Ma ago) was dominantly dip-slip (vertical displacement). So perhaps the displacement came from the depths, and, as it was extruded, was eroded and redistributed as sediments. But this has not been established.

Another possibility is that the missing southern segment of the SCF is on a crustal block that rotated away from the OWL. There is evidence that around 45 million years ago much of Oregon and southwestern
Washington rotated some 60° or more about a pivot somewhere in the Olympic Peninsula (see Oregon rotation, below). This would have left a large gap south of the OWL, which could explain why Cenozoic rocks are not found immediately south of the OWL. This suggests that a continuation of the SCF, if any, and the missing Cenozoic, might be somewhere southwest of Mount St. Helens, but this has not been observed.

Darrington–Devils Mountain Fault Zone
The interaction of the Straight Creek Fault with the OWL has yielded practically no intelligible information, and remains as enigmatic as the OWL itself. More informative is the closely related Darrington—Devils Mountain Fault Zone (DDMFZ). It runs east from a complex of faults on the southern end of Vancouver Island to the town of Darrington, where it turns south to converge with the SCF (see map, above).

North of the DDMFZ (and west of the SCF) is the Chuckanut Formation (part of the "Northwest Cascade System" of rocks shown in green on the map), an Eocene sedimentary formation which formed adjacent to the Swauk, Roslyn and other formations (also in green) south of Mount Stuart; their wide separation is attributed to right-lateral strike-slip movement along the SCF. That the northern part of the DDMFZ shows left-lateral strike-slip movement is not the inconsistency it may initially seem – think of the motion on either side of an arrowhead.

It appears that what is now the DDMFZ was originally aligned on the OWL. Then about 50 Ma ago North America crashed into what is now the Olympic Peninsula along an axis nearly perpendicular to the OWL, pushing the rock of the Mesozoic (pre-Cenozoic) Western and Eastern Melange Belts (WEMB, blue on the map) across the OWL, bowing the DDMFZ, and initiating the SCF and thereby splitting the Chuckanut Formation. On the north side of the DDMFZ, and wrapping around a bit to the east side, is a suite of distinctive rocks – the Helena—Haystack mélange ("HH Melange" on the map) – which was collapsed into vertical folds. Similarly distinctive rock is found in Manastash Ridge (shown on the map, but almost too small to see) still lying on the OWL, just east of the SCF.

This can explain an early puzzle as to why the Mesozoic rocks just south of the DDMFZ  – the Western and Eastern Melange Belts – have no counterpart on the east side of the OWL and offset to the south: they were not faulted by the SCF, but were pushed against it from the southwest.

Then it gets curiouser. Rock very similar to the WEMB (including a type called blueschist) is also found in the San Juan Islands, and along the West Coast fault on the west side of Vancouver Island. This suggests that the OWL was once a strike-slip fault, possibly a continental margin, along which terranes moved from the southeast. But similar rock also occurs in the Rimrock Lake Inlier, about 75 km south of the OWL and just west of the projected trace of the SCF, and also in the Klamath Mountains of southwestern Oregon. To account for the wide dispersal of this rock is difficult; many geologists see no alternative to transport along an extended SCF. But that upsets some of the "solutions" described above, and there is yet no consensus on this.

CLEW and Columbia Plateau
Further east is the "CLEW", the segment of the OWL from approximately the town of Cle Elum (marking the western limit of the Columbia River basalts) to the Wallula Gap (a narrow gap on the Columbia River just north of the Oregon border). This segment, and the associated Yakima fold belts, do include many northeast-trending faults crossing the
OWL. However, these are largely dip-slip (vertical) faults, associated with compressional folding of the overlying basalt. As there is typically 3 km of sedimentary deposits separating the basalts (also about 3 km thick) from the basement rock, these faults are somewhat isolated from the deeper structure. The geological consensus is that any strike-slip activity on the OWL predates the 17 Ma old Columbia River Basalt Group.

There is some evidence that some of the northwest-trending ridges may have some continuity with the basement structure, but the nature and details of the deeper structure is not known.
A 260 km long seismic refraction profile showed a rise in the crustal basement beneath the OWL, but was unable to determine if that rise was aligned with the OWL, or just coincidentally crossed the OWL at the same location as the profile; gravity data suggested the latter. The seismic data showed a uniformity of rock type and thickness across the OWL that discounts the possibility of it being a boundary between continental and oceanic crust. The results were interpreted as suggesting continental rifting during the Eocene, perhaps a failed rift basin, possibly connected with the rotation of the Klamath Mountain block away from the Idaho Batholith (see Oregon rotation, below).

There is a curious change of character of the OWL in the center of the CLEW where it crosses the roughly north-trending Hog Ranch—Naneum Anticline. West of there the OWL seems to follow a ridge in the basement structure, to the east it follows a gravity gradient, much like the Klamath–Blue Mountain LIneament (see below) does.
The significance of all this is not known.

Hite Fault System
Past the Wallula Gap the OWL is identified with the Wallula Fault Zone, which heads towards the Blue Mountains. The Wallula Fault Zone is active, but whether that can be attributed to the OWL is unknown: it may be that, like the Yakima Fold Belt, it is a result of regional stresses, and is expressed only in the superficial basalt, quite independently of what ever is happening in the basement rock.

At the western edge of the Blue Mountains the Wallula Fault zone intersects the northeast-striking Hite Fault System (HFS). This system is complex and has been variously interpreted.
Although seismically active it appears to be offset by, and thus should be older than, the Wallula fault.
On the other hand, a later study found "no obvious displacement" of either the OWL or HFS–related faults. Reidel et al. suggested that the HFS reflects the eastern margin of a piece of old continental craton (centered around the "HF" – Hite Fault – on the map) that has slipped south; Kuehn attributed 80 to 100 kilometers of left-lateral displacement along the HFS (and significant vertical displacements).

The interaction of the Wallula and Hite Fault systems is not yet understood. Past the Hite Fault System the OWL enters a region of geological complexity and confusion, where even the trace of the OWL is less clear, even to the point where it has been suggested that both the topographic feature and the Wallula fault are terminated by the Hite fault.
The original topographic lineament as described by Raisz is along the scarp on the northeast side of the Wallowa Mountains. However, there is a sense that the trend of the faulting in that area turns more to the south; it has been suggested the faulting associated with the OWL takes a large step south to the Vale Fault Zone, which connects with the Snake River Fault Zone in Idaho.
Both of these lines introduce a bend into the OWL. The Imnaha Fault (striking towards Riggins, Idaho) is more nearly in line with the rest of the OWL, and in line with the previously mentioned gravitational anomalies that run into the continent.
Which ever way is deemed correct, it is notable that the OWL seems to change character after it crosses the Hite Fault System. What this says about the nature of the OWL is unclear, although Kuehn concluded that, in northeastern Oregon or western Idaho, it is not a tectonically significant structure.

Wallowa terrane

As described above, the trace of the OWL becomes faint and somewhat confused between the Blue Mountains and the margin of the North American craton (the thick orange line on the map, just beyond the Oregon—Idaho border; the dashed line on the diagram below). This is the Wallowa terrane, a piece of crust that drifted in from somewhere else and got jammed between the Columbia Embayment to the west and the North American continent to the east and north. A notable feature is the anomalously elevated Wallowa Mountains, to the east is Hells Canyon (Snake River) on the Oregon—Idaho border. Northeast of the OWL (Wallowa Mountains) is the Clearwater Embayment ("CE" on the map), delineated by ancient rock of the craton.

Grabens form where the crust is being stretched or extended. Several explanations have been offered as to why this is happening here.  theorized that right-lateral slip on the Wallula Fault is being transferred to more southerly faults such as the Vale Fault, wherefore he labelled this region the Wallula–Vale Transfer Zone.  suggested that crustal deformation in this region is a continuation of the Basin and Range region immediately to the south, with any connection to the OWL deemed circumstantial. Another explanation is that clock-wise rotation of part of Oregon (discussed below) about a point near the Wallula Gap has pulled the Blue Mountains away from the OWL; this might also explain why the OWL seems to be bending here.

These theories may all have some truth to them, but what they might imply regarding the genesis and structure of the OWL has not been worked out.

Hells Canyon – North America's deepest river gorge – is so deep because the terrain it cuts through is so high. This is generally attributed to thinning of the crust, which allows the hotter, and therefore lighter and more buoyant, mantle material to rise higher. This is believed by many to be involved with the Yellowstone hotspot and Columbia River Basalts; the nature of such involvement, if any, is hotly debated.

While the Yellowstone hotspot and Columbia River Basalts do not seem to directly interact with the OWL, clarification of their origin and context might explain some of the OWL's context, and even constrain possible models. Likewise, clarification of the nature and history of the Wallowa terrane, and particularly of the nature and causes of the apparent bending and multiple alignments of the OWL in this region, would be a major step in understanding the OWL.

Columbia Embayment and KBML
The bedrock of Washington and Oregon, like most of the continent, is nearly all pre-Cenozoic rock, older than 66 million years. The exception is southwestern Washington and Oregon, which has virtually no pre-Cenozoic strata. This is the Columbia Embayment,  a large indentation into the North American continent characterized by oceanic crust covered by thick sedimentary deposits. ("Embayment" is perhaps a misleading term, in that it suggests a bowing of a coast line, which only seems so in the context of the modern coast. In the geological past, the coast of North America was in Idaho and Nevada, as will be described later.)

The Columbia Embayment is of interest here because its northern margin is approximately delineated by the OWL. The variations are mainly in the region of the CLEW, where sediments are buried under the basalts of the Columbia Basin, and in Puget Sound, where the Cenozoic geology extends as far north as Vancouver Island. Whether the OWL might reflect a deeper crustal boundary has been questioned by geophysical studies which may – or may not – see the characteristics expected of such a boundary.

The southern edge of the Columbia Embayment is along a line from the Klamath Mountains on the Oregon coast to a point in the Blue Mountains just east of the Wallula Gap. Unlike the OWL, this line has little topographical expression, and aside from the Hite Fault System is not associated with any major fault systems. But mapping of gravitational anomalies shows a definite lineament, some 700 km (about 400 miles) long, called the Klamath-Blue Mountain Lineament (KBML). This lineament is of interest here because of the possibility it was formerly conjugate with OWL, discussed in the next section.

Oregon rotation
Rotation of the Earth's crust around the U.S. state of Oregon has been inferred from geodesy, paleomagnetism and other measurements. The Oregon Coast Range fault block rotates around a point in Washington State. The rotational geologic pole for right-lateral faults and seismicity lineations in western Washington and Oregon is  Measurements of paleomagnetism (the record of the direction the rock was pointed when it cooled) from a variety of sites in the Coast Range – from the Klamath Mountains to the Olympic Peninsula – consistently measure clockwise rotations of 50 to 70 degrees. (See map, below.)

One interpretation of this is that western Oregon and southwestern Washington have swung as a rigid block about a pivot point at the northern end, near the Olympic Peninsula.

The interesting thing is:  backing out this rotation restores the Coast Range to an earlier position nearly juxtaposed against the OWL.  argues that the Coast Range (believed to be seamounts that had previously accreted to the continent) were rifted away from the continent starting about 50 Ma ago (mid-Eocene). This interpretation implies a "back arc" of magmatism, probably fed by a subduction zone, and possibly implicated with the intrusion of various plutons in the North Cascades around 50 Ma. Curiously, this is just when the Kula–Farallon spreading ridge passed under the OWL (discussed below).  found a spurt of rapid rotation around 45 Ma ago. This may be when this block was impinged by the Sierra Nevada block of California;  note that around 40 Ma ago there was a change in the direction of the Pacific Plate (possibly due to collision with another plate). (The cause and nature of the rifting does not seem to have been worked out yet. Certain complications in the subduction of the Kula and Farallon plates may have been involved.)

During this rotation of the Coast Range the block of continental crust that is now the Blue Mountains (on the eastern side of the KBML) was also rifted away from the Idaho batholith, and also rotated about 50 degrees, but about a point near the Wallula Gap (or perhaps further east).
In the resulting gap the crust was stretched and thinned; the buoyancy of the hotter mantle have contributed to the subsequent rise of the Wallowa and Seven Devils Mountains, and perhaps also with the irruption of the Columbia River basalts and other basalt flows.

While the rigid-block rotation model has much appeal, many geologists prefer another interpretation that minimizes whole–block rotation, and instead of rifting invokes "dextral shear" (resulting from the relative motion of the Pacific plate past the North American plate, or possibly from the extension of the Basin and Range province) as the primary driving force. The large values of paleomagnetic rotation are explained by a "ball bearing" model:
the entire Oregon block (western Oregon including the Cascades and southwestern Washington) are deemed to be composed of many smaller blocks (on the scale of tens of kilometers), each of which rotates independently on its own axis.
Evidence of such small blocks (at least in southwestern Washington) has been claimed.
Later work has attempted to work out how much of the paleomagnetic rotation reflects actual block rotation;
although the amount of rotation has been reduced (to perhaps only 28°), it seems it will not entirely go away. How this affects the postulated rifting does not seem to have been addressed. A more recent work based on analysis of GPS measurements concluded that "most of the Pacific Northwest can be described by a few large, rotating, elastic crustal blocks", but noted that in a zone about 50 km wide on the Oregon coast the apparent rotation rate seems to double; this suggests that multiple models may be applicable.

Modern measurements show that central Oregon is still rotating, with the calculated rotation poles bracketing the Wallula Gap, which is approximately the intersection of the OWL and KBML. It is intriguing to consider whether the KBML has participated in this rotation, but this is unclear; that it is unbent where it crosses the OWL suggests it is not. The OWL seems to be the northern edge of the rotating block, and the paucity of paleomagnetic data to the southeast of the KBML suggests it might be the southern edge. But the details of all this remain murky.

Puget Sound

Another notable feature that crosses the OWL is Puget Sound, and it is curious to consider the possible implications of a Puget Sound Fault. (Such a fault was once proposed on the basis of certain marine seismic data, but the proposal was stiffly rejected, and now seems to have been abandoned.) Combined terrestrial and bathymetric topography shows a distinct lineament along the west side of Puget Sound from Vashon Island (just north of Tacoma) north to the west side of Holmes Harbor and Saratoga Passage on Whidbey Island (see image). But at Port Madison (at the red bar in the image) it is split by a distinct offset of several miles.

Curiously, the southern section lies in the approximate zone of the OWL. (Note OWL–associated lineaments running parallel to the red line.) This suggests dextral offset along a strike-slip fault. But if that is the case then there should be a major fault in the vicinity of Port Madison and crossing to Seattle (perhaps at the Ship Canal, aligned with the red line) – but for this there is even less evidence than there was for the Puget Sound fault.
The significance of this lineament and its offset is entirely unknown. That it seems to be expressed in Ice Age (16 Ka) deposits implies a very recent but entirely unknown event; but perhaps these recent deposits are only draped over a much older topography. A recent offset might explain the apparent offsetting of north–south glacial drumlins bisected by the Ship Canal, but is not evident in more eastern segments.

Alternately – and this would seem very pertinent in regard of the OWL – perhaps some mechanism other than strike-slip faulting creates these lineaments.

Seattle Fault

A locally notable feature that crosses the zone of the OWL is the west–east Seattle Fault. This is not a strike-slip fault, but a thrust fault, where a relatively shallow slab of rock from the south is being pushed against and over the northern part. (And over the OWL.) One model has the slab of rock being forced up by some structure about 8 km deep. Another model has the base of the slab (again, about 8 km deep) catching on something, which causes the leading edge to roll. The nature of the underlying structure is not known; geophysical data does not indicate a major fault nor any kind of crustal boundary along the front of the Seattle Fault, nor along the OWL, but this could be due to the limited reach of geophysical methods. Recent geological mapping at the eastern side of the Seattle Fault suggests a decollement (horizontal plane) about 18 km deep.

These models were developed in study of the western segment of the Seattle Fault. In the center segment, where it crosses surface exposures of Eocene rock associated with the OWL, the various strands of the fault – elsewhere fairly orderly – meander. The significance of this and the nature of the interaction with the Eocene rock are also not known.

Examination of the various strands of the Seattle Fault, particularly in the central section, is similarly suggestive of ripples in a flow that is obliquely crossing some deeper sill. This is an intriguing idea that could explain how local and seemingly independent features could be organized from depth, and even across a large scale, but it does not seem to have been considered. This is likely due, in part, to a paucity of information on the nature and structure of the lower crust where such a sill would exist.

Southern Whidbey Island Fault and RMFZ 
The Southern Whidbey Island Fault (SWIF), running nearly parallel to the OWL from Victoria, B.C., southeast to the Cascade foothills to a point northeast of Seattle, is notable as the contact between the Coast Range block of oceanic crust to the west and the Cascades block of pre-Cenozoic continental crust to the east.
It appears to connect with the more southerly oriented right-lateral Rattlesnake Mountain Fault Zone (RMFZ) straddling Rattlesnake Mountain (near North Bend), which shows a similar deep-seated contact between different kinds of basement rock. At the southern end of Rattlesnake Mountain – exactly where the first lineament of the OWL is encountered – at least one strand of the RMFZ (the others are hidden) turns to run by Cedar Falls and up the Cedar River. Other faults to the south also show a similar turn, suggesting a general turning or bending across the OWL, yet such a bend is not apparent in the pattern of physiographic features that express the OWL. With awareness that the Seattle Fault and the RMFZ are the edges of a large sheet of material which is moving north, there is a distinct impression that these faults, and even some of the topographical features, are flowing around the corner of the Snoqualmie Valley. If it seems odd that a mountain should "float" around a valley: bear in mind that while the surface relief is about three-quarters of a kilometer (half a mile) in height, the material flowing could be as much as eighteen kilometers deep.  (The analogy of icebergs moving around a submerged sandbar is quite apt.) It is worth noting that Cedar Butte – a minor prominence just east of Cedar Falls – is the southwesternmost exposure in the region of some very old Cretaceaous (pre-Cenozoic) metamorphic rock. It seems quite plausible that there is some well-founded and obdurate obstruction at depth, around which the shallower and younger sedimentary formations are flowing. In such a context the observed arcuate fault bends would be very natural.

Broader context
It is generally assumed that the pattern of the OWL is a manifestation of some deeper physical structure or process (the "ur-OWL"), which might be elucidated by studying the effects it has on other structures. As has been shown, study of features that should interact with OWL has yielded very little: a tentative age range (between 45 and 17 million years), suggestions that the ur-OWL arises from deep in the crust, and evidence that the OWL is not (contrary to expectations) itself a boundary between oceanic and continental crust.

The lack of results so far suggests that the broader context of the OWL should be considered. Following are some elements of that broader context, which may – or may not – relate in some way to the OWL.

Plate tectonics

The broadest and fullest context of the OWL is the global system of plate tectonics, driven by convective flows in the Earth's mantle. The primary story on the western margin of North America is the accretion, subduction, obduction, and translation of plates, micro-plates, terranes, and crustal blocks between the converging Pacific and North American plates.

The principal tectonic plate in this region (Washington, Oregon, Idaho) is the North American plate, consisting of a craton of ancient, relatively stable continental crust and various additional parts that have been accreted; this is essentially the whole of the North American continent. The interaction of the North American plate with various other plates, terranes, etc., along its western margin is the primary engine of geology in this region.

Since the breakup of the Pangaea supercontinent in the Jurassic (about 250 million years ago) the main tectonic story here has been the North American Plate's subduction of the Farallon Plate (see below) and its remaining fragments (such as the Kula, Juan de Fuca, Gorda, and Explorer plates). As the North American plate overrides the last of each remnant it comes into contact with the Pacific Plate, generally forming a transform fault, such as the Queen Charlotte Fault running north of Vancouver Island, and the San Andreas Fault on the coast of California. Between these is the Cascadia subduction zone, the last portion of a subduction zone that once stretched from Central America to Alaska.

This has not been a steady process. 50 Ma (million years) ago there was a change in the direction of motion of the Pacific plate (as recorded in the bend in the Hawaiian-Emperor seamount chain). This had repercussions on all the adjoining plates, and may have had something to do with initiation of the Straight Creek Fault, and the end of the Laramide orogeny (the uplift of the Rocky Mountains). This event may have set the stage for the OWL, as much of the crust in which it is expressed was formed around that epoch (the early Eocene); this may be when the story of the OWL starts. Other evidence suggests a similar plate reorganization around 80 Ma, possibly connected with the start of the Laramide orogeny.  claimed at least five "major chaotic tectonic events since the Triassic". Each of these events is a possible candidate for creating some condition or structure that affected the OWL or ur-OWL, but knowledge of what these events were or their effects is itself still chaotic.

Complicating the geology is a stream of terranes – crustal blocks – that have been streaming north along the continental margin for over 120 Ma (and probably much, much earlier), what has recently been called the North Pacific Rim orogenic Stream (NPRS). However, these terranes may be incidental to the OWL, as there are suggestions that local tectonic structures may be substantially affected by deeper and much older (e.g., Precambrian) basement rock, and even lithospheric mantle structures.

Subduction of the Farallon and Kula Plates

Roughly 205 million years ago (during the Jurassic period) the Pangaea supercontinent began to break up as a rift separated the North American Plate from what is now Europe, and pushed it west against the Farallon Plate. During the subsequent Cretaceous Period (144 to 66 Ma ago) the entire Pacific coast of North America, from Alaska to Central America, was a subduction zone. The Farallon plate is notable for having been very large, and for subducting nearly horizontally under much of the United States and Mexico; it is likely connected with the Laramide Orogeny. About 85 Ma ago the part of the Farallon plate from approximately California to the Gulf of Alaska separated to form the Kula Plate.

The period 48–50 Ma (mid-Eocene) is especially interesting as this is when the subducted Kula—Farallon spreading ridge passed below what is now the OWL. This also marks the onset of the Oregon rotation, possibly with rifting along the OWL, and the initiation of the Queen Charlotte and Straight Creek Faults. The timing seems significant, but how all of these might be connected is unknown.

Around 30 Ma ago part of the spreading center between the Farallon Plate and Pacific Plate was subducted under California, putting the Pacific plate into direct contact with the North American plate and creating the San Andreas Fault. The remainder of the Farallon Plate split, with the part to the north becoming the Juan de Fuca Plate; parts of this subsequently broke off to form the Gorda Plate and Explorer Plate. By this time the last of the Kula Plate had been subducted, initiating the Queen Charlotte transform fault on the coast of British Columbia; coastal subduction has been reduced to just the Cascadia Subduction Zone under Oregon and Washington.

Newberry Hotspot Track – Brothers Fault Zone

The Newberry Hotspot Track – a series of volcanic domes and lava flows closely coincident with the Brothers Fault Zone (BFZ) – is of interest because it is parallel to the OWL. Unlike anything on the OWL, these lava flows can be dated, and they show a westward age progression from an origin at the McDermitt Caldera on the Oregon-Nevada border to the Newberry Volcano. Curiously, the Yellowstone hotspot also appears to have originated in the vicinity of the McDermitt Caldera, and is generally considered to be closely associated with the Newberry magmatism.
But while the track of the Yellowstone hotspot across the Snake River Plain conforms to what is expected from the motion of the North American Plate across some sort of "hotspot" fixed in the underlying mantle, the Newberry "hotspot" track is oblique to the motion of the North American Plate; this is inconsistent with the hotspot model.

Alternative models include: 1) flow of material from the top layer of the mantle (asthenosphere) around the edge of the Juan de Fuca Plate (a.k.a. "Vancouver slab"), 2) flows reflecting lithospheric topography (such as the edge of the craton), 3) faulting in the lithosphere, or 4) extension of the Basin and Range province (which in turn may be due to interactions between the North American, Pacific, and Farallon Plates, and possibly with the subduction of the triple point where the three plates came together), but none is yet fully accepted.
These models generally attempt to account only for the source of the Newberry magmatism, attributing the "track" to pre-existing weakness in the crust. No model yet accounts for the particular orientation of the BFZ, or the parallel Eugene-Denio or Mendocino Fault Zones (see map).

Bermuda Hotspot Track?
It was noted as early as 1963 that the OWL seems to align with the Kodiak-Bowie Seamount chain. A 1983 paper by Morgan suggested that this seamount—OWL alignment marks the passage some 150 Ma ago of the Bermuda hotspot. (This same passage has also been invoked to explain the Mississippi Embayment. However, substantial doubt has been raised as to whether Bermuda is truly a "hotspot", and lacking any supporting evidence this putative hotspot track is entirely speculative.

The 1983 paper also suggested that passage of a hot spot weakens the continental crust, leaving it vulnerable to rifting. But might the relation actually run the other way: do some of these "hotspots" accumulate in zones where the crust is already weakened (by means as yet unknown)?  The supposed Newberry hotspot track may exemplify this (see Megashears, below), but application of this concept more generally is not yet accepted. Application to the OWL would require resolving some other questions, such as how traces of a ca. 150 Ma event resisted being swept north into Alaska to influence a structure believed to be no older than 41 Ma (see Straight Creek Fault). Possibly there is some explanation, but geology has not yet found it.

Orofino Shear Zone
The OWL gets faint, perhaps even terminates, just east of the Oregon—Idaho border where it hits the north-trending Western Idaho Shear Zone (WISZ), a nearly vertical tectonic boundary between the accreted oceanic terranes to the west and the plutonic and metamorphic rock of the North American craton (the ancient continental core) to the east. From the Mesozoic till about 90 Ma (mid-Cretaceous) this was the western margin of the North American continent, into which various off-shore terranes were crashing into and then sliding to the north.

Near the town of Orofino (just east of Lewiston, Idaho) something curious happens: the craton margin makes a sharp right-angle bend to the west. What actually happens is the truncation of the WISZ by the WNW-trending Orofino Shear Zone (OSZ), which can be traced west roughly parallel with the OWL until it disappears below the Columbia River Basalts, and southeast across Idaho and possibly beyond. The truncation occurred between 90 and 70 Ma ago, possibly due to the docking of the Insular super-terrane (now the coast of British Columbia). This was a major left-lateral transform fault, with the northern continuation of the WISZ believed to be one of the faults in the North Cascades. A similar offset is seen between the Canadian Rocky Mountains in British Columbia and the American Rocky Mountains in southern Idaho and western Wyoming.

Then another curious thing happens: before the west-trending craton margin turns north, it seems to loop south towards Walla Walla (near the Oregon border) and the Wallula Gap (see orange-line here, or dashed-line here). (Although southeastern Washington is pretty thoroughly covered by the Columbia River Basalts, a borehole in this loop recovered rock characteristic of the craton.) It seems that the OSZ may have been offset, perhaps by the Hite Fault, but, contrary to the regional trend, headed south. If this is a cross-cutting offset it would have to be younger than the OFZ (less than 70 Ma), and older than the OWL, which it does not offset. That the OWL and the OFZ are parallel (along with many other structures) suggests something in common, perhaps a connection at a deeper level. But this offsetting relationship indicates that they were created separately.

Megashears
The OFZ (also called the Trans-Idaho Discontinuity) is a local segment of a larger structure that has only recently been recognized, the Great Divide Megashear. East of the WISZ this turns to the southeast (much as the OWL may be doing past the Wallula Gap) to follow the Clearwater fault zone down the continental divide near the Idaho—Montana border to the northwestern corner of Wyoming. From there it seems to connect with the Snake River—Wichita fault zone, which passes through Colorado, and Oklahoma, and possibly further.
There is a significant age discrepancy here. Whereas the OFZ is a mere 90 to 70 Ma old, this megashear is ancient, having been dated to the Mesoproterozoic – about a billion years ago. The Snake River—Wichita fault zone is of a similar age. What appears to be happening is exploitation of ancient weaknesses in the crust. This could explain the Newberry "hotspot track": parallel weaknesses in the crust open as the Brothers, Eugene—Denio, and Mendocino Fault Zones in response to development of the Basin and Range Province; magma from the event that initiated the Yellowstone hotspot (and possibly the Columbia River and other basalt flows) simply exploits the faults of the Brothers Fault Zone. The other faults do not develop as "hotspot tracks" simply because there is no magma source nearby. Similarly, it may be that the OWL reflects a similar zone of weakness, but does not develop as a major fault zone because it is too far from the stresses of the Basin and Range Province.

This could also explain why the OWL seems possibly aligned with the Kodiak-Bowie Seamount chain in the Gulf of Alaska, especially as the apparent motion is the wrong direction for the OWL to be a mark of their past passage. They are also on the other side of the spreading centers, though that does suggest a pure speculation that these postulated zones of weakness could be related to transform faults from the spreading center.

Precambrian basement
Following the Great Divide Megashear into the mid-continent reveals something interesting: a widespread pattern of similarly trending (roughly NW-SE) fault zones, rifts, and aeromagnetic and gravitational anomalies. Although some of the faults are recent, the NW trending zones themselves have been attributed to continental-scale transcurrent shearing at about 1.5 Ga – that's billions of years ago – during the assembly of Laurentia (the North American continent).

Curiously, there is another widespread pattern of parallel fault zones, etc., of various ages trending roughly NE-SW, including the Midcontinent Rift System, the Reelfoot Rift (in the New Madrid Seismic Zone), and others. These fault zones and rifts occur on tectonic boundaries that date to the Proterozoic – that is, 1.8 to 1.6 billions of years old. They are also roughly parallel to the Ouachita— Appalachian mountains, raised when Laurentia merged with the other continents to form the Pangaea supercontinent some 350 million years ago. It is now believed that these two predominant patterns reflect ancient weaknesses in the underlying Precambrian basement rock, which can be reactivated to control the orientation of features formed much later.

Such linkage of older and younger features seems very relevant to the OWL's troubling age relationships. The possible involvement of the deep Precambrian basement does suggest that what we see as the OWL might be just the expression in shallower and transitory terranes and surface processes of a deeper and persistent ur-OWL, just as ripples in a stream may reflect a submerged rock, and suggests that surficial expression of the OWL may need to be distinguished from a deeper ur-OWL. But neither the applicability of this to the OWL nor any details have been worked out.

Summary: What we know about the OWL
 First reported by Erwin Raisz in 1945.
 Seems to have more depressions and basins on the north side.
 Associated with many right-lateral strike-slip fault zones.
 Seems to be expressed in Quaternary (recent) glacial deposits.
 Does not offset Columbia River Basalts, so older than 17 million years.
 Not offset by the Straight Creek Fault, so probably younger than 41 million years. (Maybe.)
 Approximately separates oceanic-continental provinces.
 Not an oceanic-continental crustal boundary. (Maybe.)
 Not a hotspot track. (Maybe.)
 Seems to be aligned with lithospheric flow from the Juan de Fuca Ridge.
 Seems to be faint and confused in Oregon.

See also
Geology of the Pacific Northwest

Notes

References

Sources
OSTI: DOE's Office of Scientific and Technical Information. See also Energy Citations Database. 

.
.
.
.
.
.
.
.

.
.
. 130 pages.
Note: some catalogs misidentify this item as edited by K. A. Bergstrom. Also, another item with the same editor, title, and year (report SD-BWI-TI-111, 175 pages) is actually the rough-draft of this item.
.
.
 Google Books
.
.

.
.
.
.
.
.
.
.
.
.
.
.
.

.
.
.
.
.
.
.
.
.
.
.
.
.
.
.
.
.
.
.
.

.
.
.
.
.
.
.
.
.
.
.
.
.
.
.
 
.
.
.
.
.
.
.
.
.
.
.
.
.
.
.
.
.

.
.
.
.
.
.
.
.
.
.
.
.
.
.
.
.
.
.
.
.
.
.
.
.
.

External links
Geologic History of Washington State. Burke Museum.
Evolution of the Pacific Northwest Good text on the geology of Cascadia.

Geology of Oregon
Geology of Washington (state)